Guy Forget (born 4 January 1965) is a French tennis administrator and retired professional player. During his career, he helped France win the Davis Cup in both 1991 and 1996. Since retiring as a player, he has served as France's Davis Cup team captain.

Career

Forget first came to the tennis world's attention as an outstanding junior player who won the French Open junior title in 1982. He turned professional later that year.

His breakthrough year on the professional tour was 1986 when he made it to the fourth round of Roland Garros, his best grand slam at that point, and won his first top-level singles title in Toulouse, where both his father and grandfather had won, respectively in 1966 and 1946, and where he won again in 1991 and 1992. He was also part of the French team which won the World Team Cup. Forget also won six doubles titles in 1986, reaching his career-high doubles ranking of World Number 3 in August that year, finishing in the runner-up spot with partner Yannick Noah at the 1986 ATP Tour World Championships tournament.

In 1987, Forget and Yannick Noah finished runners-up in the men's doubles at the French Open. In 1990, Forget partnered with Jakob Hlasek to win the ATP Tour World Championships doubles title.

1991 was the most memorable year of Forget's career. He won six singles titles that year, the biggest coming at the ATP Masters Series events in Cincinnati and Paris. In both finals, he defeated Pete Sampras. He reached his career-high singles ranking of World Number 4 in March that year.

Forget was a member of the French team which won the 1991 Davis Cup. In the final, France faced the United States. Forget teamed up with Henri Leconte to win the doubles rubber, and then won the decisive singles rubber against Pete Sampras as France shocked the heavily favoured US team to win 3–1.

1996 was another notable year in Forget's career. Partnering Jakob Hlasek, he again finished runner-up in the men's doubles event at the French Open. He also won what proved to be his last career singles title in Marseille. For a second time, he was on a French team which won the Davis Cup. In the final, he teamed-up with Guillaume Raoux to win a critical doubles rubber, as France defeated Sweden 3–2.

Forget played for France's Davis Cup team for 12 years, compiling a 38–11 record.

Forget retired from the professional tour in 1997. During his career, he won a total of 11 top-level singles titles and 28 doubles titles. His career prize-money earnings totalled US$5,669,934.

After retiring as a player, Forget served as France's Davis Cup team captain. He also served as France's Fed Cup team captain from 1999 to 2004; his best result was France's performance in 2003 (with a squad including Mary Pierce, Amélie Mauresmo, Émilie Loit & Stéphanie Cohen-Aloro) when they defeated USA in the final. However, he resigned in 2004 to focus on his Davis Cup duties, and the French team then lost to Russia in the final (when Marion Bartoli & Émilie Loit lost to Anastasia Myskina & Vera Zvonareva in the last, deciding doubles match).

In 2011, the International Tennis Federation (ITF) presented him with its highest accolade, the Philippe Chatrier Award, for his contributions to tennis.

He joined the directing committee of the French Open in 2011, and in 2012 he became director of the Masters of Paris Bercy.

In 2016, he became director of the French Open after the dismissal of Gilbert Ysern.

To ensure he will never be forgotten, Forget has been immortalized in the song "Guy Forget" by the band Phish, with the lyrics "I never met a man I could not forget, except for Guy Forget".

Grand Slam finals

Doubles (2 runner-ups)

ATP World Championships finals

Doubles (1 title, 1 runner-up)

Career finals

Singles (11 titles, 8 runners-up)

Doubles

Titles (28)

Runners-up (17)

Performance timelines

Singles

Doubles

References

External links
 
 
 

1965 births
French expatriate sportspeople in the United States
French male tennis players
Hopman Cup competitors
Living people
Olympic tennis players of France
Sportspeople from Boca Raton, Florida
Sportspeople from Casablanca
Tennis players at the 1984 Summer Olympics
Tennis players at the 1988 Summer Olympics
Tennis players at the 1992 Summer Olympics
People named in the Pandora Papers